Mimura may refer to:

Mimura (village), village in Sri Lanka

People
Akio Mimura (三村 明夫, born 1940), a prominent Japanese businessman
Kakuichi Mimura (三村 恪一, 1931–20221), a former Japanese football player and manager
Makoto Mimura (三村 真, born 1989), a Japanese football player
Mimura (actress) (ミムラ, born 1984), a Japanese actress
Mimura Iechika (三村 家親, 1517–1566), a Japanese daimyō of the Sengoku period
Shingo Mimura (三村 申吾, born 1956), the governor of Aomori Prefecture in Japan
Takayo Mimura (三村 恭代, born 1985) is a Japanese actress
Tomoyasu Mimura (三村 智保, born 1969), a professional Go player
Toshiyuki Mimura (三村 敏之, 1948–2009), a Japanese baseball player and manager
Wataru Mimura (三村 渉, born 1954), a Japanese screenwriter
, a Japanese curler, 1998 Winter Olympics participant

Fictional characters
, a character in the Assassination Classroom anime and manga

Japanese-language surnames